Sheldon Cohen (born 1949) is a Montreal-based animator and children's book illustrator.

Career
His film animation works includes the National Film Board of Canada (NFB) productions The Sweater, a 1980 film adaptation of Roch Carrier's classic short story, Pies, the 2004 adaptation of the Wilma Riley short story,  I Want a Dog, the 2003 adaptation based on the children's book of the same title by Dayal Kaur Khalsa and My Heart Attack (2015).

Filmography
The Sweater (1980)
Snow Cat (1998)
I Want a Dog (2003)
Pies (2004)
Dreams Come True
The Three Wishes (2006)
My Heart Attack (2015)

Awards
The Sweater received 15 international prizes, including a BAFTA Award for Best Animation. Cohen followed this success with a picture book version of the film as well a sequel, Un champion, which won him the Governor General's Award for French-language children's illustration

References

External links
  website
 Films by Sheldon Cohen at National Film Board of Canada (nfb.ca)
 

1949 births
Anglophone Quebec people
Artists from Montreal
BAFTA winners (people)
Canadian children's book illustrators
Canadian animators
Governor General's Award-winning children's illustrators
Living people
National Film Board of Canada people
People from Hampstead, Quebec
Film directors from Montreal